Annona dodecapetala is a species of flowering plant  plants in the  Annona genus, Annonaceae, described by Jean-Baptiste Lamarck.

References

dodecapetala